The Chicago South Shore and South Bend Railroad , also known as the South Shore Line, is a Class III freight railroad operating between Chicago, Illinois, and South Bend, Indiana. The railroad serves as a link between Class I railroads and local industries in northeast Illinois and northwest Indiana. It built the South Shore Line electric interurban and operated it until 1990, when it transferred to the Northern Indiana Commuter Transportation District. The railroad is owned by the Anacostia Rail Holdings Company.

History

The South Shore Line is the last remaining of the once numerous electric interurban trains in the United States. The South Shore began in 1901 as the Chicago and Indiana Air Line Railway, a streetcar route between East Chicago and Indiana Harbor. Reorganized in 1904 as the Chicago, Lake Shore and South Bend Railway, by 1908 its route had reached South Bend, Indiana via Michigan City, Indiana. The company leased the Kensington and Eastern Railroad, an Illinois Central Railroad subsidiary, to gain access to Chicago. Passenger service between South Bend and Chicago began in 1909. The Lake Shore added freight service in 1916.

Samuel Insull acquired the bankrupt Lake Shore in 1925 and reorganized it as the Chicago South Shore and South Bend Railroad, which it remains today. The railroad experienced two more bankruptcies, in 1933 and 1938. The post-World War II decline in traffic hurt the company, and it was bought by the Chesapeake and Ohio Railway (C&O) in 1967. In 1977, the Northern Indiana Commuter Transportation District (NICTD) began subsidizing the passenger operations on the South Shore Line. In 1984, the Venango River Corporation purchased the South Shore from the C&O. Venango declared bankruptcy in 1989. In 1990, the Anacostia and Pacific Company acquired the South Shore. The NICTD purchased the passenger assets. The South Shore acquired the Kensington and Eastern Railroad from the Illinois Central Railroad in 1996.

The Surface Transportation Board classes the South Shore as a Class III railroad. The railroad operates diesel locomotives on the whole line. It also operates the former Indianapolis, La Porte and Michigan City Railroad and Chicago, Cincinnati and Louisville Railroad, once part of the New York, Chicago and St. Louis Railroad (Nickel Plate) system, from Michigan City southeast to Dillon (southeast of Stillwell), bought from Norfolk Southern in 2001. Via trackage rights it connects to many other railroads in the Chicago area, with connections to the Port of Chicago, Proviso Yard and Joliet.

The railroad's primary businesses are coal and steel. The coal is delivered to the Michigan City and Burns Harbor generating stations owned by Northern Indiana Public Service Company. The railroad also serves many customers along the line.

Notes

References

External links

 

South Shore Line
Companies based in Indiana
Michigan City, Indiana
Indiana railroads
Illinois railroads
Standard gauge railways in the United States
Transportation in Lake County, Indiana
Transportation in LaPorte County, Indiana
Transportation in Porter County, Indiana
Transportation in St. Joseph County, Indiana
Transportation in South Bend, Indiana
American companies established in 1925
Railroads in the Chicago metropolitan area
Transportation in Cook County, Illinois
Transportation in Will County, Illinois